Christopher G. Moore (born 8 July 1952) is a Canadian writer of twenty-seven novels, six works of non-fiction, editor of three anthologies, and author of four radio dramas. He is best known for his trilogy A Killing Smile (1991), A Bewitching Smile (1992) and A Haunting Smile (1993), a behind-the-smiles study of his adopted country, Thailand, and for his Vincent Calvino Private Eye series set in Bangkok.
His novels have been translated into German, French, Italian, Portuguese, Hebrew, Japanese, Chinese, Spanish, Turkish, Norwegian, Polish, Russian and Thai.

Background
While a law professor at the University of British Columbia, he had the chance to visit Japan in 1983 and from Tokyo at the invitation of a friend continued on to visit Thailand for the first time. His first book His Lordship's Arsenal was published in New York in 1985. A short documentary about Moore's writing life in Thailand is titled The Big Weird World of Christopher G. Moore.

His Lordship's Arsenal
"The whole story in His Lordship's Arsenal spins around Wild Bill Anglin, a mysterious character who ends up in flames in a Canadian brothel. The sole owner of the only prototype of a submachine gun, Wild Bill gives it to Potter, an emissary sent by none other than Colonel Thompson, the founder of Auto-Ordnance Corporation... In order to get over the impasse he felt over the Delrose Hotel case, his next-door neighbour, a rich and dodgy psychiatrist, prompts Burlock to write an autobiographical sketch of his own life. And thus, the reader learns about the judge's childhood and adolescence under the supervision of Potter, about his time at Oxford and his friendship and affair with his future stepmother, and, most of all, his fascination with guns and his qualities as an excellent marksman."

Vincent Calvino
Vincent Calvino is a fictional Bangkok-based private eye created by Christopher G. Moore in the Vincent Calvino Private Eye series. Vincent Calvino first appeared in 1992 in Spirit House, the first novel in the series. His latest appearance is in Jumpers, the 16th novel in the series published in October 2016. Moore's protagonist, Vincent Calvino, half-Jewish and half-Italian, is an ex-lawyer from New York, who, under ambiguous circumstances, gave up law practice and became a private eye in Bangkok. "Hewn from the hard-boiled Dashiell Hammett/Raymond Chandler model, Calvino is a tough, somewhat tarnished hero with a heart of gold."—Mark Schreiber, The Japan Times. Calvino has been said to epitomize "the complex, thus constantly troubled, private investigator of classic crime fiction, albeit replanted into the exotic, even surreal setting that is Thailand..."

"Thailand's finest expatriate crime-fiction novelist." —Paul Dorsey, The Nation 

Chad A. Evans' Vincent Calvino's World, A Noir Guide to Southeast Asia  explores the historical, social and cultural context of the 15 Calvino novels written over 25 years.

Works

Novels
His Lordship's Arsenal, Freundlich Books (1985) ; Critics Choice (1988); Heaven Lake Press (1999); Subway Books (2003).
Enemies of Memory, White Lotus (1990); reprinted as Tokyo Joe, Heaven Lake Press (2004) .
A Killing Smile, White Lotus  (1991) , second printing (1992), third and fourth printing BookSiam (1996); fifth and sixth printing Heaven Lake Press (2000); seventh printing (2004).
A Bewitching Smile, White Lotus  (1992) ; Heaven Lake Press (2000).
Spirit House, White Lotus   (1992), Heaven Lake Press (1999) , reprinted (2004), Grove Press (2008)
Asia Hand, White Lotus  (1993) , Heaven Lake Press (2000), Black Cat (2010).
A Haunting Smile, White Lotus (1993) , Heaven Lake Press (1999) reprinted (2004).
Cut Out, White Lotus  (1994) , Matichon, (1996), Heaven Lake Press (1999). Re-released under the title Zero Hour in Phnom Penh – .
Saint Anne, Asia Books (1994) reprinted as Red Sky Falling Heaven Lake Press (2005) .
Comfort Zone, White Lotus (1995), pocketbook edition (1997) ; Heaven Lake Press (2001).
The Big Weird, bookSiam (1996), Heaven Lake Press (2008) .
God of Darkness, Asia Books (1998) , Heaven Lake Press (1999) reprinted (2004).
Cold Hit, Heaven Lake Press (1999) ; reprinted (2004). The German translation is titled Nana Plaza.
Chairs, Heaven Lake Press (2000) .
Minor Wife, Heaven Lake Press (2002) ; reprinted (2004).
Pattaya 24/7 (2004)  Heaven Lake Press.
Waiting for the Lady, Heaven Lake Press (2003) , Subway Books (2004) Trade paperback edition Heaven Lake Press (2005).
Gambling on Magic, Heaven Lake Press (2005) .
The Risk of Infidelity Index, Atlantic Monthly Press (2008) . The Polish translation is titled Ulice Bangkoku.
Paying Back Jack, Heaven Lake Press (2009) , Grove Press (2009).
The Corruptionist, Heaven Lake Press (2010) .
9 Gold Bullets, Heaven Lake Press (2011) .
The Wisdom of Beer, Heaven Lake Press (2012) .
Missing In Rangoon, Heaven Lake Press (2013) .
The Marriage Tree, Heaven Lake Press (2014) .
Crackdown, Heaven Lake Press (2015) .
Jumpers, Heaven Lake Press (2016) .
Dance Me to the End of Time, Heaven Lake Press (2020) .

Non-fiction
Heart Talk, White Lotus  (1992), 2nd Ed. Heaven Lake Press (1998), 3rd Ed. Heaven Lake Press (2005) .
The Vincent Calvino Reader's Guide, Heaven Lake Press (2010) .
The Cultural Detective, Heaven Lake Press (2011) .
Faking It in Bangkok, Heaven Lake Press (2012) .
Fear and Loathing in Bangkok, Heaven Lake Press (2014) .
The Age of Dis-Consent, Heaven Lake Press (2015) .
Memory Manifesto: A Walking Meditation through Cambodia, Heaven Lake Press (2017) .
Rooms: On Human Domestication and Submission, Heaven Lake Press (2019) .

Anthology
Bangkok Noir, Heaven Lake Press (2011) . (Editor)
Phnom Penh Noir, Heaven Lake Press (2012) . (Editor)
The Orwell Brigade, Heaven Lake Press (2012) . (Editor)

Radio drama
View from Cambie Bridge (N.H.K.  Japan) (1983)
The Bamboo Pillar (C.B.C.) (1983)
The Semi-Detached Barrister (C.B.C.) (1981)
Sticks and Pucks (C.B.C.) (1980)

Documentary
The Impatient Artist (2016)

Critical Acclaim
"Moore's flashy style successfully captures the dizzying contradictions in [Bangkok's] vertiginous landscape."—Marilyn Stasio, The New York Times

"Think Dashiell Hammett in Bangkok. A hard-boiled, street-smart, often hilarious pursuit of a double murderer."—SFGate.

"In his novels, Moore writes about Bangkok as if it were one of the most famous cities of noir fiction. The nightlife there comes off as mysterious, dangerous, and exciting and the people in power are cast as no less corrupt than their counterparts might be in America. He makes Bangkok breathe and work as part of his cast. It's akin to what George Pelecanos does with Washington, D.C., and what Don Winslow does with San Diego. Moore is a stylist much like the writers of the early to mid-20th century who kick-started the P.I. genre in America. He writes with the angry and sad voice of Ross Macdonald and the flow of and beauty of Raymond Chandler. Penning his books in the third-person, he uses allegory and symbolism to great effect. The Calvino series is distinctive and wonderful, not to be missed, and I'm pleased to see that it is finally becoming better known in the States".

"Moore's noir thrillers and literary fiction—like Graham Greene, he alternates between 'entertainment' and serious novels—are subtle and compelling evocations of a part of the world rarely seen through our eyes."—Macleans.

"One of Moore's greatest strengths . . . is his knowledge of Southeast Asian history."—Newsweek, Joe Cochrane (November 10, 2003).

"Moore might be described as W. Somerset Maugham with a bit of Elmore Leonard and Mickey Spillane thrown in for good measure."—The Japan Times.

"Moore's work recalls the international 'entertainments' of Graham Greene or John le Carré, but the hard-bitten worldview and the cynical, bruised idealism of his battered hero is right out of Chandler. Intelligent and articulate, Moore offers a rich, passionate and original take on the private eye game, fans of the genre should definitely investigate, and fans of foreign intrigue will definitely appreciate."—KJ. Kingston Pierce, January Magazine

Awards
 The German edition of Cut Out, titled Zero Hour in Phnom Penh, the third Calvino novel, won the German Critics Award for international crime fiction in 2004 and Premier Special Director Book Award Semana Negra, Spain in 2007. 
 Asia Hand, the second Calvino novel, won the Shamus Award sponsored by the Private Eyes of America in 2011 in the Best Paperback Original category.
 Reunion, a novella, Finalist Arthur Ellis Award 2013, Best Novella.

Philanthropy
Moore is the founder of the Christopher G. Moore Foundation, a charitable organization registered in London, UK. The foundation was established in 2015 to support and promote the values of human rights and literary excellence in fiction and non-fiction. An annual prize is awarded to the best book that advances awareness of human rights.

He is also the founder of Changing Climate, Changing Lives (CCCL) Film Festival 2020. CCCL Film Festival will feature short films by young Thai film makers showcasing ways of using local wisdom and experience to adapt to climate change in Thailand.

Webcast/podcast Show Host
Host of Book Talk Conversations a twice a month webcast/podcast, where Moore interviews original thinkers from around the world. Moore's guests include renowned thought leaders from fields in the arts and sciences. The guests discuss their childhood reading for clues as to their development of creativity, curiosity and imagination.

References

External links
Author's Homepage
Seattle Times: The Risk of Infidelity Index
Vincent Calvino Private Eye Series
Christopher Moore entry at Goodreads.com

Canadian crime fiction writers
Canadian male novelists
1952 births
Living people
20th-century Canadian novelists
21st-century Canadian novelists
20th-century Canadian male writers
21st-century Canadian male writers